Now, Now, Markus or, I Need a Bird is a children's novel by Austrian author Martin Auer, first published in 1988 in German as Bimbo und sein Vogel. It is illustrated by German artist Simone Klages. 

The original was also translated into Japanese, French, Dutch, Swedish, Norwegian, and Finnish. An American English translation was published 1989 by Greenwillow Books.

Plot summary
Markus's parents never really listen to what Markus has to say and instead often react with standard phrases ("Oh my goodness!" said his mother. "Now now now" said his father). So Markus has to attract their attention by dropping dead. When he finally gets them to agree that he can have a bird he comes home with a swan. Of course he is not allowed to keep it, so he decides to live in the woods. There he is eaten by a giant, but his swan saves him. When Markus comes back home and his parents, as usual, do not believe his story, all the beings that have been saved from the giant's stomach march into the house.

External links
 New York Times Bookshelf
 The Happy Hour Storybook

1988 novels
Austrian novels
Austrian children's literature
Austrian children's novels
German children's novels
German-language novels
Picture books
Children's novels about animals
20th-century Austrian novels
1988 children's books
Beltz & Gelberg books